The Collected Writings of T. Subba Row were published in two volumes by Henk J. Spierenburg.

Subba Row's writings are about Esotericism, Theosophy, the Zodiac, the theosophic septenary, the Chakras and other topics. His commentary on the Baghavad Gita is well known among theosophists. Blavatsky appreciated Subba Row's esoteric knowledge, and she asked him to review her book The Secret Doctrine.

Some of Subba Row's writings were previously published in The Theosophist, and in the book The Esoteric Writings, T. Subba Row (Theosophical Publishing House, Adyar).

Spierenburg's T. Subba Row Collected Writings contains many articles that were not published previously. The work also contains a detailed biography of Subba Row.

References 

T. Subba Row Collected Writings, Compiled and Annotated by Henk J. Spierenburg, Volume 1 en 2. Point Loma Publications, 2001, 2002.  and 

Row, T. Subba
2001 non-fiction books